In algebraic geometry, a tropical compactification is a compactification (projective completion) of a subvariety of an algebraic torus, introduced by Jenia Tevelev. Given an algebraic torus and a connected closed subvariety of that torus, a compactification of the subvariety is defined as a closure of it in a toric variety of the original torus. The concept of a tropical compatification arises when trying to make compactifications as "nice" as possible. For a torus , a toric variety , the compatification  is tropical when the map

See also 
Tropical geometry
GIT quotient
Chow quotient
Toroidal embedding

References 

Compactification